HK Binokor Tashkent, is an ice hockey team based in Tashkent, Uzbekistan. They played in the lower level Soviet leagues (Pervaya Liga and Vtoraya Liga) from 1971 to 1988. The club was re-founded in 2012 and joined the newly created Uzbekistan Hockey League.

History 
The club was founded in 1971 as Spartak Tashkent, and made their debut in 1971–72 in the Klass A group 2 (currently known as the Vtoraya Liga). The team finished in fourth place in the Eastern Zone in their first season. Tashkent never finished lower than fifth place in their first four seasons. In 1974, the team was renamed Binokor Tashkent. In 1975–76, Binokor Tashkent was promoted to the Pervaya Liga, (then the Klass A Group 1) by virtue of winning the Eastern Zone of the Vtoraya Liga in 1974–75.

The team played eight years in the Pervaya Liga, and had relatively good finishes from 1976 to 1983. They were relegated for the 1984–85 season, following a disastrous 1983–84 season, where they won only five games and finished with 157 goals for, and 348 goals against.

Tashkent's return to the Vtoraya Liga however only lasted one season, as the team finished first in the Eastern Zone with a 40-10-4 record and promoted back to the Pervaya Liga. They had a terrible record in the Pervaya Liga in 1986–87, finishing 3-33, and were thus relegated again. The team folded after finishing 12-18-6 in the Vtoraya Liga in 1987–88.

Binokor was revived in 2012 to play in the Uzbekistan Hockey League. In October 2013, they took part in the Shymkent Tournament along with teams from Kazakhstan and Kyrgyzstan.

KHL ambition

It was reported that Binokor Tashkent can appear in the Kontinental Hockey League in either 2018/19 or 2019/20. It is planned that after the opening of the Humo Arena, it will host home matches for Binokor in the KHL. The terms of the club's admission into the league directly depend on the date of putting the arena into operation.

In March 2019, during the opening of Humo Arena, Binokor reportedly had a pathway of entering KHL via competing in second-tier league VHL by 2020 at the earliest. The possible time for getting into KHL will be 2022 with training adequate players and sufficient preparations. On 31 May 2019 it was announced that Humo would be joining the VHL for the 2019–20 season and not Binokor Tashkent as originally assumed.

Season-by-season record

Notable players
 Victor Nechayev

References

External links
Binokor Tashkent Official Website 

Ice hockey teams in Uzbekistan
Ice hockey clubs established in 1971
Sport in Tashkent
1971 establishments in the Soviet Union
Ice hockey clubs disestablished in 1988
1988 disestablishments in the Soviet Union